The Savoia-Marchetti SM.93 was an Italian dive bomber designed and produced in Italy from 1943.

Design
The SM.93 was an all-wood single-engined low-wing monoplane with retractable undercarriage. The fuselage had a monocoque structure, with a single fin and low-set tailplane. The crew of two were accommodated under a long greenhouse-style canopy, with the pilot lying in a prone position above the rear of the engine, a Daimler-Benz DB 605A liquid-cooled V12 engine, while the  gunner/radio-operator sat facing rearwards on a conventional seat. 

The two-spar wings were in three parts with the inner wings sharply tapered to the join, outboard of the landing gear attachments, and the outer wings moderately tapered to the rounded wingtips. The prone position for the pilot was intended to enable the pilot to resist the onset of g-induced loss of consciousness, but the position was uncomfortable for normal flight and severely limited the rearwards view of the pilot.

Development
The SM.93 made its maiden flight on 31 January 1944, and up to 29 March 1944 the SM-93 had made 16 test-flights with speeds up to  achieved in a dive, demonstrating the low drag and clean aerodynamics.

Operational history
Flight testing was carried out under the aegis of the Luftwaffe and despite the good performance, the prone position was found to be unsatisfactory, being uncomfortable and restricting rearward vision. The programme was halted by the German control Commission that was running weapons production in the Repubblica Sociale Italiana - RSI after the 1943 armistice.

Specifications (SM.93)

References

 "Plane Facts: Unique dive bomber". Air International, August 1982, Vol 23 No 2. p. 98. ISSN 0306-5634.

SM.093
1940s Italian attack aircraft
Single-engined tractor aircraft
Low-wing aircraft
Aircraft first flown in 1944
Prone pilot aircraft